Zsuzsanna Pálffy (born 26 December 1970) is a retired Hungarian handball player. She participated at the 2004 Summer Olympics, where she placed fifth with the Hungarian national team.

References

External links

1970 births
Living people
Handball players at the 2004 Summer Olympics
Hungarian female handball players
Olympic handball players of Hungary
People from Vác
Sportspeople from Pest County